Greater London is divided into five sub-regions for the purposes of the London Plan. The boundaries of these areas were amended in 2008 and 2011 and their role in the implementation of the London Plan has varied with each iteration.

Purpose
Sub-regions are a feature of the London Plan intended to encourage partnership working across London borough boundaries.

History
From 2004 to 2008, the sub-regions were initially the same as the Learning and Skills Council areas set up in 1999. These 2004–2008 sub-regions each had a Sub-Regional Development Framework. The sub-regions were revised in February 2008 as part of the Further Alterations to the London Plan. The 2008–2011 sub-regions, each had its own Sub-regional Implementation Framework. In 2011, the sub-regions were revised again. The 2011 sub-regions are used for statutory monitoring, engagement and resource allocation. The sub-regions have remained static since 2011, unchanged in the 2016 published plan and 2019 draft plan.

List of sub-regions

From 2011

2008–2011

2004–2008

List of boroughs

References 

 Sub-regions